Bandundu, formerly known as Banningville or Banningstad, is the capital city of Kwilu Province of the Democratic Republic of the Congo.

Location

In 2009, Bandundu had an estimated population of 133,080.

Economy
Bandundu was once a significant river port, as it is the largest town on the river between Kinshasa and Kikwit.  However, traffic on the Kasai and Kwango Rivers dropped dramatically as a result of the Second Congo War, and has yet to recover. Bandundu does have intermittent passenger and freight service to Kinshasa, Mushie and Kikwit.  Since 2008, there is a car/truck ferry service running several times per day across the Kwango.  An unpaved road, roughly 250 km long, runs from this point to the main (paved) highway between Kinshasa and Kikwit.

Bandundu is served by Bandundu Airport, with direct flights to Kinshasa.

Unlike many cities in the Congo, Bandundu has a fairly constant supply of electricity. However, this has nothing to do with Inga-Shaba HVDC line, as this line has no intermediate terminals.

Climate
Under the Köppen climate classification, Bandundu has a tropical wet and dry climate (Aw).

Sister cities 
  Attert (Belgium)

Gallery

See also
 University of Bandundu
 AS Momekano

References

 
Populated places in Kwilu Province